John Rankin Rathbone (17 March 1933 – 12 July 2002), known as Tim Rathbone, was the Conservative Member of Parliament (MP) for the seat of Lewes between 1974 and 1997.

Rathbone was the son of a Conservative MP also called John Rankin Rathbone, who represented Bodmin from 1935 until his death in the Battle of Britain in 1940. Rathbone's mother, Beatrice Wright then succeeded him as MP at the by-election, serving until 1945. Tim Rathbone was a great-nephew of Eleanor Rathbone, who had been an independent MP for the Combined English Universities between 1929 and 1946, and a staunch women's rights campaigner. He was a great-grandson of William Rathbone, a Liberal MP for Liverpool and later Carnarvonshire.

Rathbone was educated at Eton College and Christ Church, Oxford, where he read Philosophy, Politics and Economics. After a spell as merchant banker, he emigrated in 1958 to the United States where he worked for the advertising firm Ogilvy and Mather until 1966 when he returned to the UK. In 1960, he married Margarita Sanchez y Sanchez, a Cuban, with whom he had three children: John-Paul, Michael and Cristina.

Upon his return to Britain, Rathbone was recruited by party chairman Edward du Cann to work for the Conservatives as Chief Publicity Officer. He was relatively ineffectual in this position, partly because his brief overlapped with other Conservative staffers. Rathbone moved to the Charles Barker Group, a leading advertising agency in 1968, where he remained for 18 years. He was appointed to a string of directorships within the group and was managing director of Ayer Barker until 1974.

In 1973, he was selected to fight the safe Conservative seat of Lewes, which he duly won in the February 1974 election. Upon entering Parliament, it was clear that Rathbone had a reforming zeal about him, and pushed for declaration of Members' interests, electoral reform and devolution. In 1981, he divorced his first wife and the following year married Susan Stopford Sackville.

Rathbone was also a staunch critic of apartheid: On a visit to Rhodesia, he proposed ousting Ian Smith and holding transitional elections for a majority black government. In 1986, he invited Oliver Tambo, a prominent member of the South African opposition to address Conservative MPs.

When the Conservatives entered government in 1979, Rathbone was appointed as Parliamentary Private Secretary to Gerald Vaughan, the Minister for Health, a position he held until 1982. He later served as PPS to other Ministers. He did not achieve high ministerial office however because of his rebelling tendencies, which saw many label him as a "wet". He opposed the Bill that scrapped the Greater London Council and other metropolitan authorities in 1984, and also the poll tax. He also became Chairman of the Parliamentary Committee on Drug Misuse. Rathbone was a relation of, and godfather to, the future Conservative leader David Cameron. He employed Cameron as a researcher from January to March 1985.

After losing his seat to the Liberal Democrats in the 1997 general election he became chairman of Sponsorship Consultancy Ltd. and in August 1998, was expelled from the Conservative Party by William Hague for his support of the breakaway Pro-Euro Conservative Party. He died from cancer in 2002, aged 69. He is buried in the churchyard of St Peter's Church, Lowick, Northamptonshire.

References
Times Obituary
Guardian Obituary

External links 
 

1933 births
2002 deaths
Deaths from cancer
Conservative Party (UK) MPs for English constituencies
People educated at Eton College
UK MPs 1974
UK MPs 1974–1979
UK MPs 1979–1983
UK MPs 1983–1987
UK MPs 1987–1992
UK MPs 1992–1997
Tim
Politicians of the Pro-Euro Conservative Party